Sofya Andreyevna Zhuk (born 1 December 1999) is a former Russian tennis player.
She won the 2015 Wimbledon girls' singles title.

Career

Early career
Zhuk trained at the Justine Henin Academy in Belgium and her coach was Olivier Jeunehomme until 2014-2015. From 2015 moved to USA and trained at IMG Academy. End of 2018 moved to Miami,Florida and trained with Patricia Tarabini.  Her best win to date on the professional tour has been at a $60K tournament in Turkey, where she beat home favourite İpek Soylu in the final.

In 2014, she won her first tournament at Shymkent and became only the 17th 14-year-old in ITF history to win an open tournament at that age, joining a group which includes former world number ones Justine Henin and Dinara Safina.

In 2015, Zhuk competed as an unseeded 15-year-old at Wimbledon, where she won the junior girls' title against fellow Russian and No. 12 ranked junior Anna Blinkova in straight sets, 7–5, 6–4. Zhuk did not drop a set in the whole Wimbledon tournament. Zhuk became only the second Russian girl to win the Junior Wimbledon title, following the 2002 final when Vera Dushevina defeated compatriot Maria Sharapova.

2016
She made her WTA Tour singles debut at the 2016 Miami Open, where she received a wildcard into the main draw. She lost in straight sets to Zhang Shuai in the first round.

2018–19
Zhuk reached the second round of qualifying at the Australian Open, losing to Magdalena Frech of Poland, before heading to Newport Beach in California for their inaugural WTA 125K series tournament. She reached her first 125K final in this event where, after taking the first set, she eventually fell to Danielle Collins, six years her senior, in three sets.

Collins was her nemesis again when they played at Indian Wells, after both had defeated seeded players. Zhuk recorded her very first WTA Tour win when she defeated Alizé Cornet in the first round, and followed that by beating 18th seed Magdalena Rybarikova in the second round. Zhuk's second to last service game in that match took well over 20 minutes, with 12 deuces and 30 points. Rybarikova saved eleven match points during the game, before finally winning on only her second break point. Zhuk promptly broke back, and then served out to win in three sets. Collins, though having beaten 15th seed Madison Keys in the second round, always had the advantage in their third round clash, winning in straight sets. Zhuk nevertheless reached her career-high ranking of 123 after this defeat. She then went to the Premier Mandatory tournament in Miami, where she lost in the first round of qualifying.

In the European Grand Slam tournaments, she lost in the first qualifying round of the French Open to Valentini Grammatikopoulou, and in the final qualifying round for Wimbledon to Vitalia Diatchenko, having had her revenge on Grammatikopoulou in the first round.

2020
In 2020, Zhuk announced that she had paused her tennis career because of ongoing injury with possibly of coming back in the future.

Performance timeline

Singles

WTA 125 tournament finals

Singles: 1 (1 runner-up)

ITF Circuit finals

Singles: 9 (6 titles, 3 runner-ups)

Junior Grand Slam finals

Girls' singles: 1 (1 title)

Awards
2015
 The Russian Cup in the nomination Junior of the Year

References

External links

 
 

1999 births
Living people
Tennis players from Moscow
Russian female tennis players
Wimbledon junior champions
Grand Slam (tennis) champions in girls' singles
Russian expatriates in Belgium